Joseph John Maloney (26 January 1934 – 17 October 2006) was an English footballer. A half-back, he had an 11-year career in the English Football League, making 289 league and cup appearances.

He graduated from a youth player at Liverpool to sign professional forms with the club in January 1951. He signed with Shrewsbury Town three years later, and helped the "Shrews" to win promotion out of the Fourth Division in 1958–59. He transferred to Port Vale in June 1961, before moving on to Crewe Alexandra just two months later. He helped the "Railwaymen" to win promotion out of the Fourth Division in 1962–63, before he joined non-league outfit Winsford United.

Career

Liverpool
Maloney started his career at Liverpool, coming through the junior ranks at Anfield to sign professional forms in January 1951. He took the place of Bob Paisley when making his first team debut in a goalless draw at home to Bolton Wanderers in March 1953. He made a further eleven first team appearances as a central defender, but could do little to prevent Don Welsh's "Reds" from losing their First Division status at the end of the 1953–54 season.

Shrewsbury Town
Maloney signed with Shrewsbury Town in July 1954. He stayed with the "Shrews" for a further seven years, making 237 league appearances in the process. The club finished 16th in the Third Division South in 1954–55, before manager Walter Rowley took them to 13th in 1955–56 and ninth in 1956–57. They could only finish 17th in 1957–58 under the management of Harry Potts and then Johnny Spuhler, and so became founder members of the Fourth Division. Arthur Rowley was then appointed as manager, and Shrewsbury won promotion to the Third Division in 1958–59 after securing the fourth and final automatic promotion place. They posted a third-place finish in 1959–60, missing out on a second successive promotion by just one place and seven points. They finished tenth in 1960–61.

Later career
Maloney joined Norman Low's Port Vale in June 1961 and played his only game for the club at Gay Meadow on 19 August 1961, in a 4–2 defeat to Shrewsbury. He was sold on to nearby Crewe Alexandra for a small fee just two days later. Under the stewardship of Jimmy McGuigan, the "Railwaymen" finished tenth in the Fourth Division in 1961–62, before winning promotion with a third-place finish in 1962–63. After 26 league games at Gresty Road he left the English Football League to join Cheshire County League side Winsford United.

Career statistics
Source:

Honours
Shrewsbury Town
Football League Fourth Division fourth-place promotion: 1958–59

Crewe Alexandra
Football League Fourth Division third-place promotion: 1962–63

References

1934 births
2006 deaths
English footballers
Footballers from Liverpool
Association football defenders
Association football wing halves
Liverpool F.C. players
Shrewsbury Town F.C. players
Port Vale F.C. players
Crewe Alexandra F.C. players
Winsford United F.C. players
English Football League players